BRAC Bhaban is a commercial-use building located in Dhaka, Bangladesh. It is one of the tallest buildings in Dhaka with a height of .The building has 20 floors, which are used for commercial purposes.

References

External links
 
 

Buildings and structures in Dhaka
Commercial buildings in Bangladesh